6 Regiment RLC is a regiment of the Royal Logistic Corps of the British Army.

History 
The regiment was originally known as the 6th Ordnance Battalion, Royal Army Ordnance Corps. 6 Battalion deployed to the Middle East in 1990-91 as part of 1st Armoured Division for Operation Granby, the British part of the Gulf War. In 1993 it became the 6th Supply Regiment.  In 2003 the regiment deployed to Iraq as part of Operation Telic. In 2008 the regiment went to Afghanistan as part of Operation Herrick.  In 2008 after its deployment the regiment was renamed to "6 Regiment".  The regiment was part of the 102nd Logistic Brigade, but under Army 2020 it was resubordinated to the 101st Logistic Brigade.  By 2018 the regiment will be a "Theater Logistic Regiment".

Structure
The regiment's structure is as follows:
 600 Headquarters Squadron
 62 Supply Squadron
 64 Fuel & General Transport Squadron
 Light Aid Detachment from the Royal Electrical and Mechanical Engineers 

6 Regiment is paired with the reserve 159 (West Midlands) Regiment RLC.

References

Regiments of the Royal Logistic Corps
Military units and formations established in 1993